La Bibliothèque de Madame Dai  was a restaurant and museum at  84A Nguyen Du Street in Ho Chi Minh City (Saigon), Vietnam. It was founded in April 1975, by Madame Nguyen Phuoc Dai, a retired lawyer and politician who converted her library into a restaurant. French President François Mitterrand ate at the restaurant in 1991.

The restaurant contained a museum featuring "pieces of Vietnamese ceramics, many temple sculptures from the pre-15th-century Cham Kingdom of Vietnam, a number of exquisite antique Chinese pieces, a large Cambodian temple rubbing, a Vietnamese screen and a large Japanese Imari ware platter".
It is believed that the restaurant closed in the mid 2000s following the death of Madame Dai.

References

Buildings and structures in Ho Chi Minh City
Restaurants in Vietnam
Museums in Vietnam
Restaurants established in 1975
1975 establishments in Vietnam